I'm Doin' Fine Now is the debut studio album recorded by American male vocal quartet New York City, released in 1973 on the Chelsea label.

Singles
The album features the title track, which peaked at No. 17 on the Billboard Hot 100, No. 14 on the Hot Soul Singles and No. 8 on the Adult Contemporary chart. Also featured are two other chart singles: "Make Me Twice the Man" and "Quick, Fast, in a Hurry".

Track listing

Personnel
Tim McQueen, John Brown, Edward Schell, Claude Johnson – vocals

Production
Thom Bell, Wes Farrell, John Bahler – producers
Thom Bell, John Bahler – arrangers
Joe Tarsia, Michael DeLugg, Gary Kellgren – engineers

Charts

Singles

References

External links
 

1973 debut albums
New York City (band) albums
Albums produced by Thom Bell
Albums arranged by Thom Bell
Albums recorded at Sigma Sound Studios
Chelsea Records albums